Spinostropheus is a genus of carnivorous ceratosaurian theropod dinosaur that lived in the Middle Jurassic period and has been found in the Tiouraren Formation, Niger. The type and only species is S. gautieri.

History of discovery 
In 1959, Albert-Félix de Lapparent excavated fossils near Oued Timmersöi, west of In Tedreft in the Agadez desert. Among the finds were the remains of a theropod. In 1960, de Lapparent, based on these, named a second species of the genus Elaphrosaurus,  E. gautieri. The specific name honours François Gautier, the discoverer of the type locality.

In 2004, Paul Sereno, John Wilson and John Conrad named a separate genus: Spinostropheus. The generic name is derived from Latin spina, "spine", and Greek στροφεύς, stropheus, "vertebra", and refers to the epipophyseal processes of the cervical vertebrae, which are prominent and dorso-ventrally flattened.

The holotype, MNHN 1961-28, was found in a layer of the Tiouraren Formation dating from the Bathonian-Oxfordian. De Lapparent had presumed that the strata dated from the Early Cretaceous. It consists of a cervical vertebra, seven pieces of the dorsals, three pieces of the sacrum, five tail vertebrae, a humerus, the lower end of a pubic bone, the lower end of a thighbone, a piece of a shinbone, a piece of a fibula, a metatarsal, four additional pieces of the metatarsus and a phalanx of a toe. The paratypes were an ulna, a metatarsal and a second partial skeleton consisting of vertebrae and limb elements. In 2004, Sereno e.a. referred a third skeleton, specimen MNN TIG6 consisting of a series of cervical and dorsal vertebrae together with some ribs.

Description 
Spinostropheus was a relatively small theropod. In 2010, Gregory S. Paul estimated its length at 4 metres (13 feet), and its weight at 200 kg (441 lbs). In 2012 Thomas R. Holtz Jr gave a length of 6.2 meters (20.3 feet).

Phylogeny 
In 2002, a cladistic analysis by Sereno et al found Spinostropheus to be the sister taxon of the Abelisauria. In this study only the data from specimen MNN TIG6 were considered. Subsequent studies have confirmed the original interpretation as a basal ceratosaur, outside of Neoceratosauria, more closely in the evolutionary tree to Elaphrosaurus.

In 2018, Rafael Delcourt placed Spinostropheus in Noasauridae outside of Elaphrosaurinae and Noasaurinae.

See also 

 Timeline of ceratosaur research

References 

Ceratosaurs
Middle Jurassic dinosaurs of Africa
Bathonian life
Oxfordian life
Mesozoic Niger
Fossils of Niger
Fossil taxa described in 2004
Taxa named by Paul Sereno